Rungtu (Rungtu Chin), also known as Taungtha is a moribund Kuki-Chin language of Burma spoken by the Taungtha people. It is spoken in 35 villages in Htilin, Kyaukhtu, and Saw townships, Magway Region. There are 3 dialects, namely Northern Rungtu, Central Rungtu, and Southern Rungtu.

References

See also
Taungtha people
Welaung language

Kuki-Chin languages
Articles citing ISO change requests
Languages of Myanmar